Rochus Eugen (Robbie) Vogt (born December 21, 1929 in Neckarelz, Germany) is a German-American physicist, famous as the director and principal investigator of the LIGO project from 1987 to 1994.

Biography
Vogt studied from 1950 to 1952 at the University of Karlsruhe and from 1952 to 1953 at Heidelberg University. In 1953 he came to the United States. At the University of Chicago he graduated in physics with a master's degree in 1957 and a Ph.D. in 1961. His doctoral dissertation Primary cosmic-ray and solar protons was supervised by Peter Meyer. At Caltech, Vogt was an assistant professor from 1962 to 1965, an associate professor from 1965 to 1970, a full professor from 1970 to 1982, and R. Stanton Avery Distinguished Service from 1982 to 2002, when he retired as professor emeritus. He was chair of Caltech's Division of Physics, Mathematics and Astronomy from 1978 to 1983. He was the acting director of the Owens Valley Radio Observatory in 1980–1981. He was a mentor to Michael Turner, Neil Gehrels, and Anneila Sargent. Gehrels was one of Vogt's doctoral students.

In 1992 he was elected a Fellow of the American Association for the Advancement of Science.

Vogt married in 1958 and is the father of two daughters.

Selected publications

Articles
 
 
 
 
 
 
 
 
 
 </ref>

Books
  (exercises for use with volume 1 of The Feynman Lectures on Physics)

References

External links
 
 

1929 births
Living people
German astrophysicists
German emigrants to the United States
20th-century American physicists
21st-century American physicists
University of Chicago alumni
California Institute of Technology faculty
Fellows of the American Association for the Advancement of Science